The Celebrity Tour was the fifth and final concert tour by the American boy band NSYNC. Promoting their final studio album, Celebrity (2001), this is the second tour to showcase the album. The group stated that the tour would go "back to their roots", as they would be performing obscure songs from all three of their albums. The tour earned nearly $30 million.

The tour was NSYNC's last before the group went on a scheduled hiatus in May 2002 that led to an eventual disbandment.

Background
In January 2002, NSYNC announced another string of tour dates known as the "Celebrity Tour". They believed that their songs were well known by then and were able to experiment a little more. Originally, the group wanted to perform in theaters, however, they were pushed to arenas due to demand. During an interview, band member Chris Kirkpatrick stated the second outing would remove the spectacle of their previous tour PopOdyssey and focus on just music. The tour would offer a more intimate vibe with "a circular stage that gives...a 360-degree view" for fans and would incorporate reworked versions of older songs. Justin Timberlake said, "[Fans] knew when they were coming to the show last summer that they were going to get something that nobody else had, which was basically about 80 percent of the album that was going to come out after the tour. This year, obviously, they'll know the songs, but we put a twist almost on everything, so it makes it fun for them to hear it a different way and to try to recognize those tunes."

The opening acts for the Celebrity Tour included R&B singer Ginuwine, rapper and entrepreneur P. Diddy, and alternative rock band Smash Mouth. The new tour dates coincided with the band's partnership with Chili's, which they were featured in several advertisements online and on television. Before the tour began, NSYNC released the third single from their album "Girlfriend", and performed at the 2002 Winter Olympics at the Olympic Medals Plaza on February 23, 2002.

Synopsis 
The show opens with a short black-and-white clip of the guys talking about how fame and celebrity have not changed them, with Kirkpatrick saying, "We're just five guys doing what we've always done." The guys rise to the stage through fog and open with “Do Your Thing," later shifting to “Bye Bye Bye” which ends with “a waterfall of sparks”.

After singing “(God Must Have Spent) A Little More Time on You”, “Tearin’ Up My Heart”, and “Celebrity”, the guys slide down black poles out of sight. Towards the middle section, a large oval platform descends from the ceiling, allowing the guys to stroll from the stage to the center of the arena. On this elevated platform, the guys, now dressed in black tuxedos, sing a medley of covers from The Beatles and The Temptations. They end the set with a remixed two-step version of “Sailing” which was well-received.

For “No Strings Attached”, the guys swing on ropes over the crowds. Towards the end, the guys sit on stools on the stage to sing their more downtempo songs, including a singalong version of “Thinking Of You (I Drive Myself Crazy)” and a New Orleans inspired-blues version of “I Want You Back”. While sitting on the stage, the guys engage in witty banter with the audience and joke around. The band ends the show with a high-energy encore of their latest hits.

Critical response
The tour was reviewed positively by critics, who praised the tour's stripped-down feel and showmanship. Pam Sitt of The Seattle Times lauded “the new, down-to-earth, accessible [NSYNC]". Reviewing the Rose Garden show, Marty Hughley of The Oregonian wrote, "Lead singers Justin Timberlake and JC Chasez sounded more assured than ever, the whole group's harmonies were tighter and stronger, the dancing looked like second nature, and the show kept a breathless pace without ever seeming to rush". Some critics felt the tour showed NSYNC's ability to successfully cross over from the teen pop bubblegum sound to a more mature persona. Makeisha Madden of The News Tribune called the Tacoma Dome show "one big joyride through an amusement park...starting off slowly and building anticipation in the near sellout crowd during a fine-tuned, 24-song frenzy that exploded at the very end".

Much acclaim was given to NSYNC's Beatles/Temptations medley, which was called "a joyous, finger-snapping tribute...offering coolly confident versions of 'My Girl' and 'The Way You Do the Things You Do' that brought grins from the parents and grandparents in the audience". Hughley wrote the band "captured the exuberance of The Beatles as well as the silky sound and steps of the Temptations".

Leah Greenblatt of MTV News described the Rose Garden show as "electric". She dubbed it "the Justin and JC Show" and said "Justin was quickly established as the star...at least as far as the Jumbotron cameramen were concerned—with JC running a close second. Joey, Lance and Chris have all the moves down, but appear to be going through the motions at times". Greenblatt noted "Justin especially reveled in his role, and played the audience like a Stratocaster, goading them into sing-alongs and putting in some quality time alone up front at the lip of the stage". A segment in which a solo Timberlake riffs with the band guitarist received mixed reviews, with Kelefa Sanneh of The New York Times saying, "'Gone', a fluttery slow jam sung by Justin Timberlake, is the best song the group has ever recorded, but it was nearly ruined by a histrionic coda that found him dueling with the guitarist".

Sanneh continued, "The group is getting older, and its audience is, too: the young woman in the 'Justin I'm legal' t-shirt may not have been misrepresenting herself. And this tour is clearly designed to emphasize the group's musical credibility. And yet NSYNC is still a boy band, which means its existence—and its self-image—depends on its ability to entertain screaming teenagers".

Broadcasts and recordings 
Though the closing show at the TD Waterhouse Centre was filmed for a possible Celebrity tour DVD release, to date a DVD has not been released due to the footage being deemed "unusable." Bootleg DVDs were sold on eBay in 2003 with amateur footage of the concerts in Anaheim and Dallas. A six-minute video montage of the Orlando show professionally filmed by Steve Fatone appeared on YouTube in 2006.

Personnel

NSYNC
JC Chasez – lead tenor vocals
Justin Timberlake – lead tenor vocals
Chris Kirkpatrick – backing countertenor vocals
Lance Bass – backing bass vocals
Joey Fatone – backing baritone vocals

Band
Kevin Antunes – music director, keyboards
Troy Antunes – bass
Billy Ashbaugh – drums, percussion
Greg Howe – lead guitar
Ruben Ruiz – rhythm guitar, keyboards
David Cook – keyboards
Paul Howards – saxophone, percussion, keyboards
Juan Sepulveda – percussion

Opening acts 
Ginuwine (select dates)
Mr. Cheeks (select dates)
P. Diddy (select dates)
Smash Mouth (select dates)
Tony Lucca (select dates)

Set list 
The following setlist was obtained from the concert held on March 3, 2002, at the Rose Garden in Portland, Oregon. It does not represent all concerts for the duration of the tour. 
"Video Sequence"
"Do Your Thing"
"Bye Bye Bye"
"It's Gonna Be Me" (contains elements of "It Ain't My Fault")
"Instrumental Sequence (contains elements of "You Make Me Wanna..." and "Back & Forth")
"For the Girl Who Has Everything"
"(God Must Have Spent) A Little More Time on You"
"Tearin' Up My Heart" (contains elements of "If")
"Celebrity"
"Up Against the Wall"
"Video Sequence"
"She Loves You" / "I Wanna Hold Your Hand" / "Hey Jude"
"Twist and Shout" 
"My Girl / "The Way You Do the Things You Do" / "I Can't Get Next to You"
"Sailing" (contains elements of "Don't Tell Me")
"Video Sequence"
"Tell Me, Tell Me...Baby" (contains elements of "A Little Bit" and "Baby, Come Over (This Is Our Night)")
"No Strings Attached"
"This I Promise You"
"Thinking of You (I Drive Myself Crazy)"
"I Want You Back"
Encore
"Gone"
"Girlfriend (The Neptunes Remix)" 
"Pop" (contains elements of "Control")

Shows 

Cancellations and rescheduled shows

References 

NSYNC concert tours
2002 concert tours
Farewell concert tours